(pre-reform spelling: Aiséirġe; "Resurrection") was a political newspaper, published in Dublin, Ireland, from 1943 until 1973.

The newspaper was founded by Gearóid Ó Cuinneagáin as the party organ of Ailtirí na hAiséirghe. This was a minor radical nationalist and fascist political party, founded in 1942. It sought to form a totalitarian Irish Christian corporatist state. The party obtained no seats in the 1943 and 1944 general elections and gradually weakened after a split in 1945. It finished in 1958, but the newspaper continued to be published.

References

1943 establishments in Ireland
1973 disestablishments in Ireland
Defunct newspapers published in Ireland
Far-right politics in Ireland
Mass media in Dublin (city)
Newspapers published in Ireland
Newspapers established in 1943
Publications disestablished in 1973